Juncus militaris, the bayonet rush, is a species of flowering plant in the family Juncaceae, native to eastern Canada and the eastern United States. A perennial, it is found in shallow lakes and slow-moving rivers, on a variety of substrates; sand, silt, and muck.

References

militaris
Flora of Eastern Canada
Flora of the Northeastern United States
Flora of Mississippi
Flora of North Carolina
Plants described in 1824